Gustavo Tsuboi (born 31 May 1985, São Paulo) is a table tennis player from Brazil, he won three medals in double and team events in the Pan American Games. Along with Hugo Hoyama and Thiago Monteiro, Tsuboi was part of the winning team at the 2007 Pan American Games and 2011 Pan American Games.

Tsuboi won the gold medal at the inaugural 2011 Latin American Cup held in Rio de Janeiro, Brazil after defeating Paraguay's Marcelo Aguirre 4–0. Tsuboi competed in table tennis at the 2008 and 2012 Summer Olympics.

Career

2021 
In March, Tsuboi played in WTT Doha. In the WTT Star Contender event, he had a high-profile 3-0 upset over Koki Niwa in the round of 32.

2020 Olympic Games

At the 2020 Olympic Games in Tokyo, Tsuboi, 37th in the world, by defeating Nigerian Quadri Aruna (21st in the world ranking), became the 3rd Brazilian in history to reach the round of 16 in the Olympics. The feat had only been achieved by Hugo Hoyama (Atlanta-1996) and Hugo Calderano (Rio 2016).

References

1985 births
Living people
Brazilian male table tennis players
Brazilian people of Japanese descent
Olympic table tennis players of Brazil
Table tennis players at the 2008 Summer Olympics
Table tennis players at the 2012 Summer Olympics
Table tennis players at the 2016 Summer Olympics
Table tennis players at the 2007 Pan American Games
Table tennis players at the 2011 Pan American Games
Table tennis players at the 2015 Pan American Games
Pan American Games gold medalists for Brazil
Pan American Games silver medalists for Brazil
Pan American Games medalists in table tennis
South American Games gold medalists for Brazil
South American Games silver medalists for Brazil
South American Games medalists in table tennis
Competitors at the 2006 South American Games
Table tennis players at the 2019 Pan American Games
Medalists at the 2007 Pan American Games
Medalists at the 2011 Pan American Games
Medalists at the 2015 Pan American Games
Medalists at the 2019 Pan American Games
Table tennis players at the 2020 Summer Olympics
Sportspeople from São Paulo
21st-century Brazilian people